If You Can Believe Your Eyes and Ears is the debut album by the Mamas and the Papas (written as ), released in 1966. The stereo mix of the album is included in its entirety on All the Leaves are Brown (2001), a two-CD retrospective compilation of the band's first four albums and various singles, as well as on The Mamas & the Papas Complete Anthology (2004), a four-CD box set released in the UK. The mono mix of the album was remastered and reissued on vinyl by Sundazed Records in 2010, and on CD the following year. It is the band's only album to reach number one on the Billboard 200.

In 2003, If You Can Believe Your Eyes and Ears was ranked number 127 on Rolling Stone magazine's list of the 500 greatest albums of all time, with its rank rising to number 112 in the 2012 revision.

Cover art
Five versions of the album cover were produced:
 No. 1:  The original cover (shown at upper right) features the group in a bathroom, sitting in a bathtub with a toilet in the corner. These were pulled from stores after the toilet was judged indecent; they have since become valuable on the collector's market, with one copy selling at auction for $300.
 No. 2: Most of the toilet bowl is covered with a scroll listing the presence of "California Dreamin'" on the album.
 No. 3: Two additional songs from the album are shown on the scroll: "Monday, Monday" and "I Call Your Name".
 No. 4: Same as No. 3 but with a gold record award blurb added (in black) to the left of the group.
 No. 5: Black cover with a closely cropped shot of the group that hid the fact that the picture was taken in a bathroom.

The cover art was produced and shot by photographer Guy Webster.

The cover shows the artist as "The Mama's and the Papa's", a grammatical error that has not been corrected on any of the album's reissues.

Reception

The album received a positive retrospective review in Rolling Stone, in which critic Rob Sheffield remarked "The Mamas and the Papas celebrated all the sin and sleaze of Sixties L.A. with folksy harmonies, acoustic guitars, and songs that told inquiring minds way more than they wanted to know. And on their January 1966 debut, If You Can Believe Your Eyes and Ears, they somehow made it all sound groovy." He described the album as a dark look at L.A. culture that sounds accessible and optimistic thanks in large part to Lou Adler's production. Bruce Eder wrote for AllMusic that the album "embraced folk-rock, pop/rock, pop, and soul, and also reflected the kind of care that acts like the Beatles were putting into their records at the time." He added that it had a stronger polish than the group's other albums, in part because it predated the personal conflicts that tainted their later works. The album was included in Robert Dimery's 1001 Albums You Must Hear Before You Die.

Track listing

Personnel
Denny Doherty – vocals
Cass Elliot – vocals
John Phillips – vocals, guitar
Michelle Phillips – vocals
P.F. Sloan – guitars, additional vocals
Larry Knechtel - keyboards
Hal Blaine – drums, percussion
Joe Osborn – bass guitar
Bud Shank – flute solo on "California Dreamin'"
Peter Pilafian – electric violin
Technical
Lou Adler – producer
Bones Howe – engineer
Guy Webster – photography

Chart positions

See also
List of controversial album art

References

External links
  
 If You Can Believe Your Eyes and Ears at Myspace (streamed copy where licensed)

The Mamas and the Papas albums
1966 debut albums
Albums produced by Lou Adler
Albums recorded at United Western Recorders
Dunhill Records albums
Obscenity controversies in music